Wright Creek may refer to:
 Wright Creek (British Columbia), Canada
 Wright Creek (Missouri), United States
 Wright Creek (Nanticoke River tributary), Delaware, United States

See also 
 Wrights Creek (disambiguation)